The 2012 Tipperary Senior Hurling Championship was the 122nd staging of the Tipperary Senior Hurling Championship since its establishment by the Tipperary County Board in 1887. The championship began on 30 June 2012 and ended on 14 October 2012.

Drom-Inch were the defending champions.

On 14 October 2012, Thurles Sarsfields won the championship after a 1-21 to 2-15 defeat of Drom-Inch in the final at Semple Stadium. It was their 32nd championship title overall and their first title since 2010.

Results

Semi-finals

Final

External links

 The 2012 County Senior Hurling Championship

References

Tipperary Senior Hurling Championship
Tipperary